This is a list of angels in theology, including both specific angels (e.g., Gabriel) and types of angels (e.g., seraphim).

See also
 Angel
 Angels in art
 Fallen angel
 Guardian angel
 Gustav Davidson
 Heaven
 Heavenly host
 Hierarchy of angels
 Ishim
 List of angels in fiction
 List of theological demons
 Recording angel
 Seven Archangels

References

 
Angels